Abel Hammond (born 1 June 1985 in Accra) is a Ghanaian football forward playing with Tema Youth.

Career
Hammond began his career with Salemi Aces FC. He studied at Accra Academy Secondary School and played for the Saint Stars in 2001. In 2002, at the age of 17, he joined the primavera team Brescia Calcio and subsequently played for A.S. Cittadella, to which he was loaned to, in 2003. He stayed at A.S. Cittadella for half a year and returned to Brescia Calcio in December 2003. In January 2004 his contract with Brescia Calcio expired and he then moved to Serie D club AC Cologna Veneta. During his three years stint at AC Cologna Veneta, he played in 76 matches and scored 19 goals. His contract with the team expired in the summer of 2007 and he signed for US Sanremese, where he played in only five games. He left the club in November 2007 to sign for Ghana Premier League club Liberty Professionals FC. On 11 September 2008, Hammond left Liberty Professionals FC to sign for the I-League club Mumbai FC. On 20 September 2009 Kingfisher East Bengal signed the striker from Mumbai FC.

In the winter break of the 2010–11 season, Hammond moved back to Europe and signed with FK Metalac Gornji Milanovac and marked his debut in the Serbian SuperLiga on 2 April 2011 as a substitute in the 0–1 defeat against FK Vojvodina.

Honours
East Bengal
Indian Federation Cup: 2009

References

External links
 Abel Hammond at Srbijafudbal
 
 Abel Hammond Stats at Utakmica.rs

1985 births
Living people
Footballers from Accra
Ghanaian footballers
Ghanaian expatriate footballers
Association football forwards
Liberty Professionals F.C. players
Brescia Calcio players
S.S.D. Sanremese Calcio players
Expatriate footballers in Italy
Ghanaian expatriate sportspeople in Italy
Mumbai FC players
East Bengal Club players
Expatriate footballers in India
Ghanaian expatriate sportspeople in India
FK Metalac Gornji Milanovac players
Serbian SuperLiga players
Expatriate footballers in Serbia
Ghanaian expatriate sportspeople in Serbia
Alumni of the Accra Academy